Marc is a French, Catalan, and Romanian masculine given name of Latin origin, derived from the Roman name Marcus. 

Marc may refer to:

Marc Acito (born 1966), American playwright, novelist, and humorist
Marc Alaimo (born 1942), American actor
Marc Albrighton (born 1989), English footballer
Marc Alexandre, French judoka
Marc Allégret (1900–1973), French screenwriter, photographer and film director
Marc Almond, English artist and one half of Soft Cell
Marc Andreessen, chair of Opsware
Marc Andreu, French rugby union player
Marc D. Angel, rabbi and author
Marc Andreyko (born 1970), American comic book writer and screenwriter
Marc Angelucci, American lawyer and men's rights activist
Marc Anthony, Puerto Rican-American singer-songwriter
Marc Asch (born 1946), American politician
Marc Bartra, Spanish footballer
Marc Batchelor (1970–2019), South African footballer 
Marc Bator (born 1972), German television moderator 
Marc Bell, drummer for The Ramones
Marc Bell, Canadian absurdist cartoonist
Marc Bélanger (musician) (born 1940), Canadian violinist
Marc Bennett (1967–2019), British travel advisor 
Marc Bergevin (born 1965), Canadian former ice hockey player and former general manager of the Montreal Canadiens
Marc Bellemare (born 1956), Canadian lawyer and politician 
Marc-André Blanchard (born 1965), Canadian executive, lawyer, and former diplomat
Marc Blitzstein, American composer
Marc Bloch (1886–1944), French historian
Marc Blondin, French Canadian professional wrestling commentator
Marc Blucas, American actor
Marc Bolan (1947–1977), singer and songwriter for T. Rex
Marc de Bonte, Belgian kickboxer
Marc Breslow (1925–2015), American television director
Marc Brown (disambiguation)
Marc Isambard Brunel, French engineer, father of Isambard Kingdom Brunel
Marc Bulger, American football player
Marc-Antoine Camirand (born 1979), Canadian racing driver
Marc Camille Chaimowicz, French-British painter
Marc Canter, well-known figure in the sphere of open standards, social networks and blogging
Marc Carroll (born 1972), Irish musician, songwriter and multi-instrumentalist
Marc Cécillon, French rugby union player and convicted murderer
Marc Chagall, Belarusian painter
Marc Cherry (born 1962), American television writer and producer
Marc Cohn, American Grammy Award-winning singer-songwriter
Marc Collins-Rector (born 1959), American businessman
Marc Copani (born 1981), American professional wrestler and school principal
Marc Copland, American jazz pianist
Marc H. Dalton (born 1965), retired United States Navy rear admiral
Marc Dalton, Canadian politician
Marc Davis, multiple people
Marc Donato (born 1989), Canadian actor
Marc Dreier (born 1950), former American lawyer 
Marc Dupré (born 1973), Canadian singer, songwriter and musician 
Marc Dutroux (born 1956), Belgian serial killer
Marc Ecko, American entrepreneur
Marc-Antoine Eidous (c.1724 – c.1790), French writer
Marc Ellis, an All Black rugby player
Marc Emery, Canadian politician and marijuana advocate
Marc Enfroy (born 1965), American composer, songwriter and producer 
Marc Fisher (born 1958), American senior editor for The Washington Post
Marc-Vivien Foé, Cameroonian footballer
Marc Ford (born 1966), American blues-rock guitarist
Marc Forster, German-Swiss filmmaker and screenwriter
Marc Gagnon, Canadian athlete and Olympian
Marc Garneau, Canadian astronaut
Marc Gasol, Catalan basketball player
Marc-Amable Girard (1822–1892), second premier of Manitoba
Marc Godart, Time Crisis 5 character
Marc Gonsalves (born 1972), American Northrop Grumman member
Marc Guéhi (born 2000), English footballer
Marc-André Hamelin, French-Canadian pianist
Marc Hamilton (1944–2022), Canadian singer 
Marc Hannaford, Australian jazz pianist
Marc Hempel, American cartoonist known for his work on The Sandman with Neil Gaiman
Marc Hoffmann (born 1973), German sex offender and murderer
Marc Hodler, International Olympic Committee member
Marc Hogan (born 1981), American journalist
Marc de Hond (1977–2020), Dutch television presenter, businessman, author, and theatre performer
Marc Jacobs, American fashion designer
Marc Jampole (born 1950), American poet, public relations executive, former television news reporter and political blogger
Marc Janko, Austrian footballer
Marc Kielburger, Canadian social entrepreneur, Co-founder of WE Charity and ME to WE 
Marc-Uwe Kling, German author and comedian
Marc Kudisch, American stage actor
Marc Labrèche (born 1960), Canadian actor, comedian and host
Marc Lacroix (biochemist) (born 1963), Belgian biochemist
Marc Lacroix (photographer), French photographer
Marc Lasry, American billionaire hedge fund manager
Marc Lawrence, American actor
Marc Lépine (1964–1989), Canadian mass murderer and perpetrator of the 1989 École Polytechnique massacre
Marc Maron, American stand-up comedian
Marc Márquez, Spanish Grand Prix motorcycle racer
Marc May, American football player
Marc Meneau (1943–2020), French chef
Marc Mero (born 1960), American professional wrestler
Marc Methot (born 1985), Canadian professional ice hockey player
Marc Miller (born 1947), American game designer
Marc Morley, American lacrosse player
Marc Moro, (born 1977), Canadian former professional hockey player
Marc Mozart, German songwriter, record producer and music manager
Marc Munford (born 1965), American football player
Marc Okrand, creator of the Klingon language
Marc Overmars, Dutch footballer
Marc Panther, French-Japanese singer and member of the Japanese pop group Globe
Marc Platt (producer) (born 1957), American producer 
Marc Quessy, Canadian paralympic athlete
Marc Quiñones (born 1963), American percussionist
Mark A. Ratner (born 1942), American chemist and Professor Emeritus at Northwestern University
Marc Ratner, American Vice President of Regulatory Affairs with the Ultimate Fighting Championship 
Marc Ravalomanana, president of Madagascar
Marc Ribot, composer
Marc Rich (1934–2013), Swiss-based Spanish billionaire who fled the United States in 1983 to live in Switzerland in order to avoid prosecution
Marc Rotenberg (born 1960), American lawyer
Marc Rucart (1893–1964), French journalist and Radical politician
Marc Armand Ruffer (1859–1917), Swiss-born British experimental pathologist and bacteriologist
Marc Sappington (born 1978), American spree killer
Marc Eugene Schiler, professor of the USC School of Architecture at the University of Southern California
Marc Shaiman (born 1959), American composer 
Marc Singer, Canadian actor, best known for his role in the film The Beastmaster and its sequels
Marc Sondheimer, producer at Pixar
Marc Staal (born 1987), Canadian ice hockey player
Marc Summers (born 1951), American TV host
Marc Thiercelin, (born 1960) French professional sailor
Marc Thompson, several people
Marc Waldie, American volleyball player
Marc Warren (disambiguation)
Marc Wasserman (born 1968), American actor and lawyer
Marc Weiner, American comedian, puppeteer, and actor
Marc Wilkinson (1929–2022), Australian-British composer and conductor
Marc Wilmots (born 1969), Belgian footballer 
Marc Woodard, NFL player
Marc Yu (born 1999), American musical child prodigy
Marc Scott Zicree (born 1955), American science fiction author, television writer and screenwriter

Fictional characters
Marc, a character in the 2013 coming-of-age movie Puppylove

See also
Mark (given name)
Saint-Marc (disambiguation)

Catalan masculine given names
French masculine given names
Romanian masculine given names